Jacques Robert (born 1928) is a French jurist, former member of the Constitutional Council of France, former director of the French-Japanese House in Tokyo, former vice-president of the Venice Commission, honorary president of the University of Paris and president of Panthéon-Assas University from 1979 to 1984. He has been a professor at the universities of Algiers, Rabat, Grenoble, Paris, and Panthéon-Assas.

Works
Les Violations de la liberté individuelle commises par l’Administration et le problème des responsabilités
La Liberté religieuse et le régime des cultes
Le Juge constitutionnel, juge des libertés
La Garde de la République
Enjeux du siècle : nos libertés

References

1928 births
Presidents of Panthéon-Assas University
Academic staff of Paris 2 Panthéon-Assas University
Living people